The 2017 Reinert Open was a professional tennis tournament played on outdoor clay courts. It was the tenth edition of the tournament and was part of the 2017 ITF Women's Circuit. It took place in Versmold, Germany, on 10–16 July 2017.

Singles main draw entrants

Seeds 

 1 Rankings as of 3 July 2017.

Other entrants 
The following players received a wildcard into the singles main draw:
  Katharina Gerlach
  Franziska Kommer
  Linda Puppendahl
  Lena Rüffer

The following players received entry from the qualifying draw:
  Vivian Heisen
  Sviatlana Pirazhenka
  Anastasia Zarycká
  Kimberley Zimmermann

The following players received entry as lucky losers:
  Laura-Ioana Andrei
  Miriam Kolodziejová
  Sandra Samir

Champions

Singles

 Mihaela Buzărnescu def.  Barbara Haas, 6–0, 6–2

Doubles
 
 Katharina Gerlach /  Julia Wachaczyk def.  Misa Eguchi /  Akiko Omae, 4–6, 6–1, [10–7]

External links 
 2017 Reinert Open at ITFtennis.com
 Official website

2017 ITF Women's Circuit
Reinert Open
2017 in German tennis
2017 in German women's sport